John Williams (died 1829) was a planter and slave-owner in Jamaica. He owned the Cool Spring Plantation in Clarendon Parish and had an interest in Provost's Rock River plantation. He had family connections to the Isle of Wight in England. He was elected to the House of Assembly of Jamaica in 1820 for the parish of Clarendon.

References 

Members of the House of Assembly of Jamaica
Year of birth missing
1829 deaths
British slave owners
Planters from the British West Indies
Clarendon Parish, Jamaica